Rakas Henrietta (Finnish: My Dear Henrietta) is a historical novel by Finnish author Kaari Utrio.

Novels by Kaari Utrio
1977 novels
Novels set in Helsinki
Novels set in the 1840s
20th-century Finnish novels
Finnish historical novels